William Samuel Hall (November 8, 1871 – January 26, 1938) was a dentist and a Canadian federal politician.

Hall was elected to the House of Commons of Canada as a Social Credit candidate. He defeated 5 other candidates to win his seat. Hall would die 3 years into his term vacating his seat on January 26, 1938.

External links
 

1871 births
1938 deaths
Canadian dentists
Members of the House of Commons of Canada from Alberta
Social Credit Party of Canada MPs